Miner's Revenge is a video game developed and published by Lazer-Tron for the arcade.

Gameplay
In the game, two players shoot ghosts as they descend an abandoned coal mine.

Reception
Next Generation reviewed the arcade version of the game, rating it one star out of five, and stated that "You can't reload, you don't control the cart, each level is nearly identical, and you could easily drop your gun, walk away, and forget this game ever existed.  There's more interaction in watching a Saturday morning cartoon than in this dud."

References

Arcade video games